The Intercontinental Tag Team Championship is a professional wrestling tag team title in Japanese promoting Pro Wrestling Zero1, typically reserved for (but not exclusive to) heavyweight (>) wrestlers. It was created on June 14, 2001, three months after then Pro Wrestling Zero-One's creation, when Samoa Joe and Keiji Sakoda (though Zero1 has since ceased to recognize both their reign as well as the following reign by Steve Corino and Mike Rapada) defeated Yuuki Ishikawa and Katsumi Usuda. This was during a time when Zero-One was a member of the National Wrestling Alliance; since the two organizations' parting in late 2004, the NWA does not recognize or sanction it, though it retains the NWA initials. It is one of two tag team titles currently active in Zero1, along with the NWA International Lightweight Tag Team Championship, contested exclusively among junior heavyweights. There have been a total of 56 recognized individual champions and 45 recognized teams, who have had a combined 49 official reigns.

Title history

Combined reigns

By team
{| class="wikitable sortable" style="text-align: center"
!Rank
!Team
!No. ofreigns
!Combineddefenses
!Combined days
|-
!1
| Emblem || 2 || 7 || 459
|-
!2
|Masato Tanaka and Zeus || 1 || 4 || 419
|-
!3
| Minoru Fujita and Takuya Sugawara || 1 || 4 || 399
|-
!4
| Dangan Yankees || 1 || 6 || 397
|-
!5
| Kohei Sato and Kamikaze || 2 || 5 || 367
|-
!6
| Kohei Sato and Daisuke Sekimoto || 1 || 4 || 334
|-
!7
| ZERO64 || 1 || 1 || 330
|-
!8
| Shinjiro Otani and Akebono || 1 || 4 || 315
|-
!9
| Junya Matsunaga and Takafumi || 1 || 2 || 301
|-
!10
| Masato Tanaka and Takuya Sugawara || 1 || 3 || 298
|-
!11
| Yuko Miyamoto and Masashi Takeda || 1 || 2 || 280
|-
!12
| Shinjiro Otani and Yumehito Imanari || 1 || 1 || 268
|-
!13
| Wild Child || 1 || 2 || 257
|-
!14
| Masato Tanaka and James Raideen || 1 || 2 || 253
|-
!15
| Yoshihiro Takayama and Kohei Sato || 1 || 2 || 232
|-
!16
| Masato Tanaka and Yuji Hino || 1 || 3 || 203
|-
!17
| Kohei Sato and Ryoji Sai || 2 || 3 || 183
|-
!18
| Ikuto Hidaka and Minoru Fujita || 1 || 1 || 138
|-
!19
| Matt Ghaffari and Tom Howard || 1 || 2 || 135
|-
!20
| Shinjiro Otani and Kamikaze || 1 || 1 || 125
|-
!21
| Ryoji Sai and Osamu Namiguchi || 1 || 1 || 123
|-
!22
| Steve Corino and C. W. Anderson || 1 || 3 || 120
|-
!23
| Takao Omori and Shiro Koshinaka || 1 || 5 || 119
|-
!24
| Steve Corino and Y2P-160kg || 1 || 1 || 115
|-
!25
| Gajo and Tomohiko Hashimoto || 1 || 1 || 114
|-
!26
| Hideki Suzuki and Kohei Sato || 1 || 1 || 109
|-
!27
| Kai and Yusaku Obata || 1 || 0 || 101
|-
!28
| Taru and Chris Vice || 1 || 0 || 100
|-
!29
| Ikuto Hidaka and Munenori Sawa || 1 || 0 || 95
|-
!30
| Mr. Wrestling 3 and Charles Evans || 1 || 0 || 94
|-
!31
| Towa Iwasaki and Tsugutaka Sato || 1 || 1 || 93
|-
!32
| Shinjiro Otani and Yuki Ishikawa || 1 || 0 || style="background-color:#bbeeff"|
|-
!rowspan=2|33
| Shinya Hashimoto and Yoshiaki Fujiwara || 1 || 2 || 75
|-
| Akebono and Shogun Okamoto || 1 || 1 || 75
|-
!35
| Shito Ueda and Yusaku Obata || 1 || 0 || 73
|-
!36
|style="background-color:#FFE6BD"| Kubota Brothers † || 1 || 3 || +
|-
!37
| Masayuki Okamoto/Shogun Okamoto and Yutaka Yoshie || 1 || 0 || 62
|-
!38
| Shinya Hashimoto and Naoya Ogawa || 2 || 1 || 53
|-
!39
| Shinjiro Otani and Takao Omori || 1 || 1 || 33
|-
!40
|Masato Tanaka and Wataru Sakata || 1 || 0 || 28
|-
!41
| Samoa Joe and Keiji Sakoda || 1 || 0 || 25
|-
!42
| Hartley Jackson and Taru || 1 || 0 || 20
|-
!43
| Quiet Storm and Yuji Hino || 1 || 0 || 16
|-
!44
| Nathan Jones and Jon Heidenreich || 1 || 1 || 6
|-
!45
| Steve Corino and Mike Rapada || 1 || 0 || 3
|-

By wrestler

See also
List of National Wrestling Alliance championships

Footnotes

References

External links
ZEROONEUSA.com title history
Wrestling-Titles.com title history
TitleHistories.com title history 

Pro Wrestling Zero1 championships
Tag team wrestling championships
Intercontinental professional wrestling championships